Convoy RA 55B was an Arctic convoy during World War II.
It was one of a series of convoys run to return Allied ships from Soviet northern ports to ports in Britain.
It sailed at the end of December 1943, reaching British ports in early January 1944.  All ships arrived safely.

Forces
RA 55B consisted of eight merchant ships which departed from Kola Inlet on 31 December 1943.
Close escort was provided by the two destroyers, Whitehall and Wrestler, and three corvettes. These were supported by an Ocean escort of eight Home Fleet destroyers led by Onslow (Capt.JA McCoy commanding).
Following the Battle of the North Cape on 26 December, which resulted in the sinking of the German battleship Scharnhorst, the threat from German surface units was, for the time being, eliminated, and RA 55B dispensed with the usual distant cover  by heavy units of the Home Fleet.

RA 55A was however threatened by a U-boat force of some thirteen boats in a patrol line, code-named Eisenbart, in the Norwegian Sea, which had operated against all the December convoys.

Action
RA 55A sailed from Kola with its escort on 31 December 1943, accompanied by an eastern local escort of three minesweepers.
On 1 January 1944 the local escort returned to Murmansk, leaving RA 55B to continue.
German air reconnaissance was unable to find RA 55B in the gloom of the polar night, and although several Eisenbart boats made contact, their attacks were ineffectual.
RA 55B was able to shake off pursuit and on 7 January met the western local escort of two minesweepers, which brought the convoy into Loch Ewe on the following day, 8 January 1944.

Conclusion
The eight ships of RA 55B arrived in Britain without loss, while all German attempts to attack the convoy had failed.

Ships involved

Allied ships

Merchant ships

Daldorich 
Empire Stalwart
Fort Columbia
Fort Poplar

James Gordon Bennet
Lucerna
San Ambrosio
Thomas Kearns

Close escort
 Whitehall 
 Wrestler
 Gleaner
 Honeysuckle
 Oxlip
 Rhodedendron
 
Ocean escort
 Onslow
 Onslaught
 Orwell
 Impulsive
 Haida
 Huron
 Iroquois

Axis ships

U-boat force
 
 U-314  
 U-387
 
 U-601
 U-716
 U-957

Notes

References
 Clay Blair : Hitler's U-Boat War [Volume 2]: The Hunted 1942–1945 (1998)  (2000 UK paperback ed.)
 Paul Kemp : Convoy! Drama in Arctic Waters (1993) 
 Paul Kemp  : U-Boats Destroyed  ( 1997).  
 Axel Neistle  : German U-Boat Losses during World War II  (1998). 
 Bob Ruegg, Arnold Hague : Convoys to Russia (1992) 
 Bernard Schofield : (1964) The Russian Convoys BT Batsford  ISBN (none)
  RA 55B at Convoyweb

RA 55B